Oldisleben is a village and a former municipality in the district Kyffhäuserkreis, in Thuringia, Germany. Since 1 January 2019, it is part of the town An der Schmücke.

History
Within the German Empire (1871–1918), Oldisleben was part of the Grand Duchy of Saxe-Weimar-Eisenach.

Archeological site

References

Former municipalities in Thuringia
Kyffhäuserkreis
Grand Duchy of Saxe-Weimar-Eisenach